The 2001 Angola Basketball Super Cup (8th edition) was contested by Primeiro de Agosto, as the 2000 league champion and Petro Atlético, the 2000 cup winner. Primeiro de Agosto was the winner, making it is's 1st title.

The 2001 Women's Super Cup (6th edition) was contested by Primeiro de Agosto, as the 2000 women's league champion and Desportivo da Nocal, the 2000 cup runner-up. Desportivo da Nocal was the winner.

2001 Men's Super Cup

2001 Women's Super Cup

See also
 2000 Angola Basketball Cup
 2000 BAI Basket

References

Angola Basketball Super Cup seasons
Super Cup